Bexhill FM is a restricted service licence FM frequency station broadcasting to Bexhill on Sea, East Sussex, UK for two weeks a year.

The station is regulated by Ofcom, the UK's communications regulator, whenever it is on air in its RSL period. The station is managed when it is on air by Bexhill High Academy and Bexhill College students.

Radio stations in Sussex
Radio stations established in 2003
Bexhill-on-Sea